This is a list of fictional characters in the British psychological crime drama television series Luther, its international remakes and film continuation.

Overview

Main characters

John Luther

Detective Chief Inspector John Luther, portrayed by Idris Elba, works for the Metropolitan Police Service, in the Serious Crime Unit. He is a legendary figure on the force both for his dedication and his ingenious approaches to solving cases. However, the horrors of Luther's job have given rise to emotional demons which often put him at odds with colleagues and loved ones. Because of this, he constantly breaches protocol and uses unorthodox (and sometimes illegal) methods, such as breaking into properties without warrants to find clues or violently threatening suspects or witnesses. He is also given to belligerent fits of anger. Nevertheless, he is known to hate firearms, and he refuses to kill or directly cause the death of suspects.

Luther returns from leave to investigate the double murder of Alice Morgan's parents, and quickly realises that she committed the crime. However, Morgan's methodical destruction of evidence keeps Luther from conclusively proving her guilt. A peculiar relationship develops between Luther and Morgan, and Luther approaches her for help on occasion. Morgan insinuates herself into Luther's relationship with Zoe with the intention of helping their marriage, yet her means only further complicate Luther's personal problems.

When Zoe is shot and killed by Luther's best friend, the corrupt Detective Chief Inspector Ian Reed, Luther – known for his violent temper – is blamed for the murder because Reed sets up the crime scene to implicate him. Luther subsequently becomes the focus of a citywide manhunt. Events transpire during which Alice kills Reed during a confrontation between him, on one side, and her, Luther, and Zoe's boyfriend Mark on the other, at a deserted Waterloo station. After providing proof that Reed murdered Zoe, Luther is allowed to return to the service, where he has now been assigned to the reorganised Serious and Serial Crime Unit, headed by DSU Schenck.

At the start of the second series, Luther has moved into an unmaintained flat at the Aylesbury Estate and shows suicidal tendencies. Luther also desires to leave the Met. He is approached by Caroline Jones, the wife of one of his former suspects, who asks him to locate her delinquent daughter, Jenny. When Luther tracks down Jenny and rescues her from a pornography shoot, the production's backers, Toby Kent and his grandmother, "Baba", violently pressure the inspector to hand her back. Rather than doing so, Luther strikes an illegal deal to provide them with information, in exchange for setting Jenny free. When Jenny kills Toby in self-defence, Luther manages to cover up her crime and threatens Baba with a visit from Alice if she continues to harass Jenny and her mother.

Idris Elba said of his character, "You know when you watch the news and someone has killed their children? And your instinct is to be like, 'Oh, if I got my hands on them'? Well, his instinct is to do that but he's a police officer. And when he does get his hands on them, he doesn't necessarily follow procedure. He will be as vindictive as the criminal".

Alice Morgan

Alice Morgan, played by Ruth Wilson, is a research scientist with a genius-level IQ. When we first meet her, Alice has murdered her parents – and their dog – in such a calculated fashion, that not even Luther is able to prove her guilt, of which he is absolutely certain. Alice's core belief, that nothing in life ultimately matters, comes into direct conflict with Luther's own beliefs. She frequently insinuates herself into Luther's professional and personal life, both as an enemy and ally, with behaviours ranging from stalking him and those close to him, to helping him avoid criminal prosecution. She also provides Luther with a unique insight into the criminal mind. Luther describes Alice as a malignant narcissist.

At the beginning of Series 2, Alice is in a mental institute following the events of Series 1 (she had confessed to killing Ian Reed). Luther goes to visit her, whereupon it is revealed she tried to kill herself by cutting her wrist. While visiting, Luther offers Alice an apple. She declines it, but after he leaves, he throws his half-eaten apple over the wall of the mental institute's gardens in which Alice is walking. When she picks the apple up, it is revealed that Luther has stolen a swipe card and given it to Alice to help her escape.

After escaping, she visits him one last time, asking Luther to come away with her to travel overseas. However, he refuses, as he cannot shake his dedication to being a police officer, and – he says: "I am who I am, and you are who you are". Alice then leaves him behind. She returns in the Series 3 season finale, when Luther is wrongly accused of arranging for DS Ripley's murder by a killer vigilante. After freeing him from police custody, Alice aids Luther in proving his innocence, and in the vigilante's capture. Having made her interest in developing a relationship with Luther clear, after again evading arrest, she meets up with Luther, and the episode ends as they debate what to do next.

Alice's apparent death in Belgium is announced in the first few minutes of Series 4. It is revealed that she and Luther have secretly been in regular communication by burner phone, and had been planning to flee to Sao Paulo. Her apparent death, and Luther's investigation of it, is a key component of the two-episode series.

Morgan is eventually revealed to be alive in Series 5, having faked her death when she realized Luther was never truly going to run away with her. Luther attempts to protect her and himself from Alice's robbery of crime boss George Cornelius, but eventually their relationship reaches its inevitable destruction when Morgan murders DS Catherine Halliday. Ultimately culminating in a struggle with Luther and Morgan falling to her apparent death and Luther's arrest for the deaths of Morgan, Halliday, and Benny Silver.

Justin Ripley

Detective Sergeant Justin Ripley, played by Warren Brown, is a young policeman eager to be partnered with a detective like Luther, but he doesn't quite realise what doing so will entail.

After Luther is framed for Zoe's murder and flees, Ripley is the only one who believes that he is innocent and aids Luther in destroying the main piece of evidence against him. Ripley is arrested at the end of Series 1, after saving a fugitive Luther's life from a police marksman. For this action, he is put back in uniform and told he will remain in uniform for two years (though he keeps his rank of sergeant). At the beginning of Series 2, Luther has Ripley reinstated as a detective and puts him back on his team. DS Gray remarks that DS Ripley was a rising star but has now tarnished his career. At the end of Series 2 episode 1, Ripley is kidnapped by Cameron Pell, who tortures him throughout the next episode before Ripley manages to escape and aid in Pell's arrest.

In Series 3, Ripley is questioned by DSU George Stark and DCI Erin Gray, who are attempting to bring down Luther. At first, Ripley seems to be helping them, but he later tells them he has been honoured to work with Luther. In episode 3, Ripley chases the vigilante killer Tom Marwood into an alleyway and corners him. Despite Marwood's insistence, Ripley refuses to back down, so Marwood fatally shoots him.

Martin Schenk

Detective Superintendent Martin Schenk, played by Dermot Crowley, initially works for Police Complaints and is universally feared for his steel-trap mind. A highly intuitive and observant individual, who appears unassuming, Schenk is determined to rid the force of corrupt officers which, despite Schenk's high regard for Luther's abilities, may include Luther himself. Schenk appeared in episodes 3 to 6 in Series 1 and returned in Series 2 to head up the new Serious and Serial Crime Unit, replacing Rose Teller as DCI Luther's boss.

Benny 'Deadhead' Silver

DS Benny "Deadhead" Silver, played by Michael Smiley, was first introduced in Series 1, when Luther needed some technological expertise. In Series 2, he has become a full-time employee of the new Serious and Serial Crime Unit. He gets his nickname Benny Deadhead from his laid back nature. In his first appearance, as well as the final two episodes of Series 2, he is shown to have an interest in role-playing games as well as World of Warcraft. This knowledge comes in handy in Series 2, when the SSU is trying to catch twin killers for whom murder is part of a game.

Erin Gray

DCI Erin Gray, played by Nikki Amuka-Bird, is a new member of the team in Series 2. She is highly intelligent and ambitious, but young and naive, having come from a sheltered background. She makes it clear in episode 1 she doesn't want her name tarnished like Ripley's, and she keeps her distance from Luther. Luther keeps her on because she is newly qualified and good at her job. Having become convinced that Luther is dirty, she attempts to find evidence of this during Series 2, but Ripley eliminates the evidence to protect Luther.

Without evidence, her complaints about Luther smear her career, and she leaves the Serious and Serial Unit. Between Series 2 and 3 she joins a unit investigating police corruption, and is promoted to Detective Chief Inspector. During Series 3, she is working with Detective Superintendent George Stark in an investigation against Luther and is last seen being taken to hospital following an attack from the vigilante killer Tom Marwood.

Ian Reed

Detective Chief Inspector Ian Reed, played by Steven Mackintosh, is Luther's peer and closest friend. Reed lives his life by his own strict code, which he ultimately compromises by taking bribes. That deviation ends up haunting him when an operation he is part of blows up in his face, and he must cover his tracks by killing off everyone who knows the truth, including Luther. At the end of series 1, he threatens Luther's life and is shot and killed by Alice Morgan.

Zoe Luther

Zoe Gillian Luther (née Cornell), played by Indira Varma, is John Luther's estranged wife and a human rights lawyer. During their separation, she has fallen in love with her colleague, Mark North, and finally feels happy with her life. Luther, distraught that she has met someone else, gives into violent rages. Through various events, including a one-time post-breakup sexual encounter with Luther, Zoe is sorely tempted to return to her marriage, but she realises things would only go back to the way they were and she ultimately leaves him.

Zoe is killed by Ian Reed in the penultimate episode of Series 1. While being held at gunpoint, she tries to defend herself with a kitchen knife, simultaneously talking to Luther on the telephone, who hears the murder take place.

Rose Teller

Detective Superintendent Rose Teller, played by Saskia Reeves, is Luther's boss in the Serious Crimes Unit during Series 1. Having stuck her neck out to get Luther reinstated following his mental breakdown, she realises it may be hard to play modern-day police politics whilst supporting Luther's unique style of policing. DSU Teller does not return in Series 2, and Luther's new commander, Martin Schenk notes obliquely that good cops sometimes suffer for the misdeeds of the bad ones, suggesting that Teller may have taken the fall for DCI Reed's corruption.

Mark North

Mark North, played by Paul McGann, is a human rights lawyer and, Zoe says: "the polar opposite of Luther". Mark fell in love with Zoe and believed she would be much happier with him than with her husband, which causes considerable friction with Luther.

Alice Morgan frequently harasses Mark and, on one occasion, has him beaten up by a group of female gang members in an attempt to get Zoe and Luther back together, before Luther insists that she stop. This only fuels Mark's dislike for Luther, and Mark becomes increasingly desperate to extract Zoe from the situation. However, after Zoe's death and learning her killer's true identity, Mark plays a part in Ian Reed's death. By the beginning of Series 2, Luther and Mark have become friendly, and Luther trusts Mark to the extent that he uses his house as a safehouse for Jenny Jones.

Emma Lane

Detective Sergeant Emma Lane, played by Rose Leslie the newest recruit to the Serious and Serial Unit, Emma finds herself working side by side with the legendary John Luther, after the death of her former boss DCI Theo Bloom.

Growing up, Emma has always been the posh one – perhaps not a natural fit among the crack troops the Serious and Serial Unit. But there's plenty of grit behind her privileged exterior and she is ready to fight tooth and nail for the line of duty.

See also
 Luther

References

Characters, Luther
Luther